Faruk Nafiz Çamlıbel (18 May 1898 – 8 November 1973) was a leading Turkish poet, author and later politician.

Biography
Faruk Nafiz Çamlıbel was born in Istanbul, Ottoman Empire, on 18 May 1898. His mother, Fatma Ruhiye, was the daughter of a merchant named Necati Bey and his father, Süleyman Nazif Bey, who served as a public servant at the Ministry of Forestry. Faruk Nafiz graduated from Bakırköy Secondary School and Hadika-i Meşveret High School. Having studied medicine for a while, he quit his education and decided to work in the newspaper Ati. From 1919 to 1920 he was among the contributors of Büyük Mecmua which was a magazine supporting the Independence War. 

From 1946 to 1960 Faruk Nafiz was a member of the Turkish Parliament for the Democrat Party. Following the military coup on 27 May 1960 he was arrested together with other members of the party. He was imprisoned in Yassıada and was then transferred to Kayseri and was released from the prison without any charge after sixteen months.

Faruk Nafiz Çamlıbel died on board on 8 November 1973 and buried at Zincirlikuyu cemetery on 11 November.

Bibliography
Poetry
 "Şarkın Sultanları" (1918)
 "Gönülden Gönüle" (1919)
 "Dinle Neyden" (1919)
 "Çoban Çeşmesi" (1926)
 "Suda Halkalar" (1928)
 "Bir Ömür Böyle Geçti" (1933)
 "Elimle Seçtiklerim" (1934)
 "Akarsu" (1936)
 "Tatlı Sert" (Mizahi Şiirler, 1938)
 "Akıncı Türküleri" (1938)
 "Heyecan ve Sükun" (1959)
 "Zindan Duvarları" (1967)
 "Han Duvarları" (1969)

Theatre plays
 "Canavar" (1925)
 "Akın" (1932)
 "Özyurt" (1932)
 "Kahraman" (1933)
 "Yayla Kartalı" (1945)
 "İlk Göz Ağrısı" (1946)

Performances
 "Bir Demette Beş Çiçek" (1933)
 "Yangın" (1933)

Novels
 "Yıldız Yağmuru" (1936)
 "Ayşe'nin Doktoru" (1949)

See also
 List of contemporary Turkish poets
 Öküz Mehmet Pasha Complex

References

External links
 Biyografi.info - Biography of Faruk Nafiz Çamlıbel 
 Aruz.com - Biography of Faruk Nafiz Çamlıbel 

20th-century Turkish politicians
20th-century poets
1898 births
1973 deaths
Akbaba (periodical) people
Burials at Zincirlikuyu Cemetery
Deputies of Istanbul
19th-century people from the Ottoman Empire
Turkish poets
Democrat Party (Turkey, 1946–1961) politicians